The World Baseball Softball Confederation Europe, known as WBSC Europe, was established on February 10, 2018, during a Congress of the Confederation of European Baseball and the European Softball Federation in Val d’Europe, France. the establishment of WBSC Europe followed the historic merger of the Confederation of European Baseball (CEB) and the European Softball Federation (ESF).
As of September 2022, WBSC Europe counts 40 members for baseball and 39 for softball. 

The CEB was founded in 1953 with 5 members, which were Belgium, France, West Germany, Italy and Spain. 

The CEB was responsible for operating the European Baseball Championship, a championship that has been running since 1954 in Europe.
In 2010, there were 112,303 players in the CEB countries.

The ESF was founded in 1976 with 6 members, which were Belgium, France, Italy, Germany, Netherlands, and Spain. 

The ESF was responsible for operating the European Softball Championships.

WBSC Europe History
On February 14, 2018, in Paris, France, the delegates of 38 National Baseball and Softball Federations approved the merger of the Confederation of European Baseball (CEB) and the European Softball Federation (ESF) at the joint European Baseball Softball Congress in Paris, France. 

In reaction to the 2022 Russian invasion of Ukraine, WBSC Europe relocated competitions that had been scheduled to be held in Russia during 2022, and excluded Russian and Belarusian teams from all its 2022 competitions.

CEB History
In April 1953 in Paris, France, 5 countries (Belgium, France, Germany, Italy and Spain) gave birth to the European Baseball Federation, originally named in French Féderation Européenne de Baseball (FEB). The first Executive Committee was formed by President Steno Borghese of Italy, Secretary General Roger Panaye of Belgium and Vice President and head of the Technical Commission Luis Barrio of Spain.

In 1954 the first European Championship was played in Belgium and Italy claimed the victory.

The sixth member country, the Netherlands, was accepted at the 1956 Congress in Milan.

In 1957 in Amsterdam, Netherlands, Sweden became the seventh member, and FEB became an eight-country federation in London in 1960 when Great Britain was accepted.

In 1963 FEB launched their first club competition. The first European champion of the club competition was Picadero Barcelona.

In 1967 the federations of Italy and the Netherlands announced their withdrawal from FEB and founded a new Federation: Fédération Amateur Baseball. In April 1969 the two Federations re-entered FEB.

In 1971 another Italian, Bruno Beneck, succeeded Steno Borghese during the Congress held in Milan. San Marino was accepted as the ninth member.

In 1972 the organization changed its name to European Amateur Baseball Confederation or CEBA, according to the French Confederation Européenne de Baseball Amateur.

In 1974 the first U-18 European Championship for players of age 18 and under was played. The first title went to the Netherlands. The Dutch also claimed the first U-16 title in 1975. In 1979, during the Congress in Trieste, Italy, Denmark was accepted as the 10th member.

There were already 15 member countries when, in 1985, during the Congress in Zandvoort, Netherlands, Guus Van der Heiden of the Netherlands succeeded Bruno Beneck as the president.

When Van der Heiden died, Italian Federation President Aldo Notari was elected as the 4th president of the organization during the 1987 Congress in Barcelona.

During the 1990s the number of member countries increased dramatically up to 33 by 1994, at which time it was decided to drop the word Amateur from the name of the Confederation, known since then as CEB: Confederation Européenne du Baseball in French and Confederation of European Baseball in English. CEB also created the Cup Winners Cup in 1990 and the CEB Cup in 1993.

Martin Miller of Germany, who had been part of the executive since 1995, succeeded Aldo Notari (who was nominated Honorary President) in 2005, during the Congress in Prague. Miller was confirmed as president during the 2009 Congress in San Marino. During Miller's presidency, the number of European Cups for Clubs was reduced to two. Starting in the 2009 season, only a single European Cup for Clubs is played.

Miller resigned from the presidency during the 2012 Congress in Rotterdam. Petr Ditrich of the Czech Republic was the interim president until the 2013 Congress in Bled, Slovenia, that elected Jan Esselman of the Netherlands as the new president.

ESF History
In 1976 in Rome, Italy, 6 countries (Belgium, France, Germany, Italy, Netherlands and Spain) gave birth to the European Softball Federation (ESF). The first Executive Committee was formed by President Bruno Benek of Italy and Secretary General Theo Vleeshhouwer of Netherlands.

WBSC World Rankings

Baseball

Softball

Baseball5

Historical leaders
Highest Ranked Europe member in the WBSC Rankings

Men's baseball

Women's baseball

Men's softball

Women's softball

Championships

Baseball
Men's
 European Baseball Championship
 European Under-23 Baseball Championship
 U-18 European Baseball Championship
 U-15 European Baseball Championship
 U-12 European Baseball Championship
Women's
 European Baseball Championship Women
Club
 European Cup (baseball)
Defunct
 European Champion Cup Final Four
 European Under-21 Baseball Championship
 Super 6 Baseball and Softball

Softball
Men's
 Men's Softball European Championship
 U-23 Men's Softball European Championship
 U-18 Men's Softball European Championship
 U-16 Men's Softball European Championship
 Men's Slowpitch European Championship
Women's
 ESF Women's Championship
 U-22 Men's Softball European Championship
 U-18 Men's Softball European Championship
 U-15 Men's Softball European Championship
Coed
 ESF Co-Ed Slowpitch European Championships
Club
 Men’s Softball European Super Cup
 Women’s Softball European Cup
 Coed Slowpitch European Cup
Defunct
 ESF Women's Division B Championship

Baseball5
 Baseball5 European Championship
 U-17 Baseball5 European Championship

Current title holders

Members

Baseball

Softball

Former members

Notes

See also
European Softball Federation
European Baseball Championship
European Cup (baseball)

References

Further reading
Chetwynd, Josh (2008). Baseball in Europe: A Country by Country History. 344 pp. (77 photos). Print ; EBook

External links
 WBSC Europe website
 Confederation of European Baseball website
 European Softball Federation website

 
Base
Sports organizations established in 1953
1953 establishments in Europe
Europe